Venkatesan Harikrishnan (born 4 July 1982), also known as Harry Venka, is an Indian retired professional boxer.

Harikrishnan fought for the WBA - PABA Super Welterweight title against Frank LoPorto in Australia in February 2011. Harikrishnan lost the bout by TKO.

Harikrishnan's last professional bout was against Gunnar Jackson, New Zealand veteran and at the time New Zealand Champion, in Tauranga, New Zealand. Despite any official announcement of his retirement, Harikrishnan has not fought since.

Professional boxing record

References

External links
 

1982 births
Living people
Indian male boxers
New Zealand male boxers
New Zealand sportspeople of Indian descent